The Salad Bowl was an annual post-season  American college football bowl game played at Montgomery Stadium in Phoenix, Arizona, from 1947 to 1955.  The bowl was sponsored by the Phoenix and Valley of the Sun Kiwanis Clubs.  The bowl stopped inviting college teams in 1952; the 1953 and 1954 games were played among service teams.  It was an all-star game in both January and December, 1955.

Game results

See also
 List of college bowl games

References

 
Defunct college football bowls
College football all-star games
Military competitions in American football
Sports in Phoenix, Arizona